Echinonyssus is a genus of mites in the family Laelapidae.

Species
 Echinonyssus alvarezi (Bassols, Quintero, Moreno & Vessi, 1991)
 Echinonyssus apoensis (Delfinado, 1960)
 Echinonyssus blanchardi (Trouessart, 1904)
 Echinonyssus confucianus (Hirst, 1921)
 Echinonyssus creightoni (Hirst, 1912)
 Echinonyssus distinctitarsus Tenorio & Radovsky, 1979
 Echinonyssus eileenae Tenorio, 1981
 Echinonyssus galiciae Fain & Pereira-Lorenzo, 1993
 Echinonyssus harpagonis Tenorio & Radovsky, 1979
 Echinonyssus isabelae Estebanes-Gonzalez & Smiley, 1997
 Echinonyssus liberiensis (Hirst, 1912)
 Echinonyssus lukoschusi Tenorio & Radovsky, 1979
 Echinonyssus melogalius Gu, Wang & Yuan, 1987
 Echinonyssus molinae Fain & Rack, 1990
 Echinonyssus nasutus Hirst, 1925
 Echinonyssus palawanensis (Delfinado, 1960)
 Echinonyssus soricis (Turk, 1945)
 Echinonyssus talpae (Zemskaya, 1955)
 Echinonyssus teresae Estebanes-Gonzalez & Smiley, 1997
 Echinonyssus umbonatus Tenorio & Radovsky, 1979

References

Laelapidae